Pup Academy is a television series that premiered on Disney Channel in the United States and on TVOntario in Canada on August 26, 2019. The series stars Don Lake, Christian Convery, Aria Birch, Gabrielle Miller, Riley O'Donnell, Chance Hurstfield, Dylan Schombing, and Brian George.

Premise 
Charlie is a man who has established a secret academy for puppies in a parallel world where they are educated on how to become dogs. His grandson, Morgan moves into his neighborhood and he enlists him to help educate the puppies, Spark, Corazon, and Whiz at the time when the bond between human and canine that is powered by the Canis Primus constellation starts to fade. This ties into a prophecy involving a boy and a stray puppy in which the Dean of Graduates (or D.O.G. for short) has to find that special stray, save Pup Academy, and restore the bond between humans and canines.

Cast and characters 
 Don Lake as Charlie, the janitor of Pup Academy. His ancestors helped found the school
 Christian Convery as Morgan, the grandson of Charlie who helps out at Pup Academy
 Aria Birch as Izzy, a girl who Morgan befriends
 Gabrielle Miller as Molly, Morgan's mother
 Riley O'Donnell as the voice of Spark, a street-smart stray Boxer
 Chance Hurstfield as the voice of Corazon, a goofy Golden Retriever who is owned by Izzy
 Dylan Schombing as the voice of Whiz, a nervous and clever sheepdog who is owned by James
 Brian George as the voice of D.O.G., a Pup Academy Siberian Husky dean who looks for the stray of the prophecy

Production 
On October 15, 2018, it was announced that Disney and Netflix ordered Pup Academy, with a feature-length pilot, as well as 22 regular episodes. Serving as Air Bud Entertainment's debut television series on Disney Channel, the series is executive produced by Anna McRoberts and Robert Vince and directed by Robert Vince. On July 31, 2019, it was announced that the series would premiere on August 26, 2019; following the premiere, new episodes of the series resumed on September 4, 2019. The series also began airing on TVOntario's TVOKids block in Canada on August 26, 2019. Internationally, the show launched on Netflix in February 2020.

Episodes

Ratings 
 
}}

References

External links 
 

2010s American children's television series
2010s Canadian children's television series
2020s American children's television series
2020s Canadian children's television series
2019 American television series debuts
2019 Canadian television series debuts
Disney Channel original programming
TVO original programming
Television shows about dogs